Cornel Smit (born ) is a South African rugby union player for the  in the Currie Cup and the Stormers in the Pro14 Rainbow Cup SA. His regular position is centre.

Smit was named in the  squad for the Super Rugby Unlocked campaign.

References

South African rugby union players
Living people
1997 births
Rugby union centres
Stormers players
Western Province (rugby union) players